Ida Street Viaduct is a registered historic structure in Cincinnati, Ohio, listed in the National Register on November 28, 1980.  The reinforced concrete bridge is located in the hilltop neighborhood of Mount Adams.

The Ida Street Viaduct, constructed in 1931 in the Art Deco style, replaced a wooden trestle that carried Cincinnati streetcars.

Notes

External links
Documentation from the University of Cincinnati

Bridges completed in 1931
Bridges in Cincinnati
Road bridges on the National Register of Historic Places in Ohio
National Register of Historic Places in Cincinnati
Concrete bridges in the United States